Paul Lorrette (30 December 1886 – 5 June 1971) was a French painter. His work was part of the painting event in the art competition at the 1924 Summer Olympics.

References

1886 births
1971 deaths
19th-century French painters
20th-century French painters
20th-century French male artists
French male painters
Olympic competitors in art competitions
People from Langres
19th-century French male artists